Earth and High Heaven was a 1944 novel by Gwethalyn Graham. It was the first Canadian novel to reach number one on The New York Times bestseller list and stayed on the list for 37 weeks, selling 125 000 copies in the United States that year.

Set in Montreal, Quebec during World War II, the novel portrays a romance between Erica Drake, a young woman from a wealthy Protestant family in Westmount, and Marc Reiser, a Jewish lawyer and soldier from Northern Ontario. The young lovers are forced to confront and overcome the anti-Semitism of their society in their quest to form a lasting relationship.

Literary significance & criticism
Originally published by Jonathan Cape and Thomas Nelson & Sons (Canada), the most recent edition of the novel was published by Toronto's Cormorant Books in 2004.

Awards and nominations
Earth and High Heaven won the 1944 Governor General's Award for fiction, and the 1945 Anisfield-Wolf Book Award. It was also the ninth bestselling book of 1945 in the United States.

Film, TV or theatrical adaptations
Producer Samuel Goldwyn bought the movie rights to Earth and High Heaven for $100 000, intending for Katharine Hepburn to play Erica Drake. He initially hired Ring Lardner Jr. to adapt the screenplay.

Goldwyn was, however, dissatisfied with the results, telling Lardner that he "betrayed [him] by writing too much like a Jew.". Goldwyn subsequently hired a succession of other writers to develop the script, and remained dissatisfied with the final product.

After Elia Kazan released the similarly themed Gentleman's Agreement in 1947, Goldwyn abandoned Earth and High Heaven rather than risk having it labeled by critics as a copy of Kazan's film.

References

External links
 

1944 novels
Antisemitism in Canada
Governor General's Award-winning fiction books
Jewish Canadian history
Jews and Judaism in Montreal
Jonathan Cape books
New Canadian Library
Novels set in Montreal